Desinec is a settlement in the eastern part of the Municipality of Črnomelj in the White Carniola area of southeastern Slovenia. The area is part of the traditional region of Lower Carniola and is now included in the Southeast Slovenia Statistical Region.

The local parish church is dedicated to Saint Mark and belongs to the Parish of Črnomelj. It is a medieval building that was restyled in the Baroque style in the 18th century.

References

External links
Desinec on Geopedia

Populated places in the Municipality of Črnomelj